Ola Haldorsen (born 29 April 1965) is a retired Norwegian football defender.

He came through the ranks of IL Bølgen and representer Norway once as a youth international. In 1988 he moved to Halden to study at Østfold District College, and played football for Moss FK from 1989. He returned to Bodø/Glimt in 1991, remaining there throughout 1998 and winning the 1993 Norwegian Football Cup Final.

He was appointed head coach in 2005 on a two-year contract, but was sacked after the 2005 season.

References

1965 births
Living people
People from Sør-Varanger
Norwegian footballers
FK Bodø/Glimt players
Moss FK players
Norwegian First Division players
Eliteserien players
Association football defenders
Norway youth international footballers
Norwegian football managers
Sportspeople from Troms og Finnmark